The soundtrack is from the film Raees, starring Shah Rukh Khan, was released on 21 December 2016 by the music label Zee Music Company. The songs released on the original soundtrack are listed below. As of December 2020, the soundtrack has received more than 1.5billion streams on YouTube.

Songs
The song "Laila Main Laila" from the 1980 film Qurbani was written by Indeevar, originally composed by Kalyanji–Anandji, and sung by Kanchan and Amit Kumar. The chorus has been recreated for the film by composer Ram Sampath. Additional lyrics are written by Javed Akhtar. The original Qurbani music video featured actress Zeenat Aman with Feroz Khan, while the Raees music video features Indian-Canadian actress Sunny Leone with Shah Rukh Khan.

"Saanson Ke" track is sung by Javed Ali in the film version. The song "Halka Halka" was removed from the film and the album because it didn't suit the film's script, but was later released after the film's theatrical release.

Track listing

References

2017 soundtrack albums
Hindi film soundtracks